Kudrino is a rural locality (a village) in Spasskoye Rural Settlement, Vologodsky District, Vologda Oblast, Russia. The population was 11 as of 2002. There are 6 streets.

Geography 
Kudrino is located 12 km southwest of Vologda (the district's administrative centre) by road. Nepotyagovo is the nearest rural locality.

References 

Rural localities in Vologodsky District